Maria Pilar Riba Font  (born 10 May 1944) is an Andorran politician. She is a member of the Social Democratic Party of Andorra.

External links

Page at the General Council of the Principality of Andorra

Members of the General Council (Andorra)
1944 births
Living people
Andorran women in politics
Social Democratic Party (Andorra) politicians
21st-century women politicians